Gelre Hospitals is a group of hospitals comprising hospitals in Apeldoorn and Zutphen, and an outpatient clinic in Lochem. As of 31 December 2006, Gelre Hospitals maintains a total of 925 beds, 115 full-time physicians (for a total of 190 physicians), and 3300 total personnel. Gelre Hospitals serves as a teaching hospital for medical residents in 12 specialties, as well as for nurses and laboratory, radiological and surgical assistants.

Locations

Lukas (Apeldoorn)
Lukas hospital is the largest hospital in the Gelre group. It is located in the southern part of Apeldoorn and offers all common medical specialties with the exception of cardiothoracic surgery and neurosurgery. It has a 24/7 emergency department. During 2005 - 2008, it underwent major renovation and expansion, allowing all units from the Juliana site, which was closed in 2009, to move to the Lukas site.

Zutphen
The Zutphen hospital is the second largest hospital in the Gelre group. It is located in the southeastern part of Zutphen and offers all common medical specialties with the exception of cardiothoracic surgery and neurosurgery. It has a 24/7 emergency department. An out-of-hours general practitioners clinic is co-located with the emergency department. In 2011, the hospital moved to a new building. The previous building, known as Spittaal, built in 1974, was demolished in 2013.

Polikliniek Lochem (Lochem)
The outpatient clinic in Lochem offers outpatient services for most common specialties, such as cardiology and neurology, including laboratory and basic radiologic facilities.

External links
Website of the hospitals

Hospitals in the Netherlands
Zutphen
Hospital networks